Umri, Kurukshetra, according to the Puranas, is a village named after Odaumbar Rishi as it was his taposthali.

Transport

 By road: Buses of Haryana Roadways and other state corporations ply through Umri and connect it to Delhi, Chandigarh and other important places. Taxi service is also available.
 By air: The airports closest to Umri (Kurukshetra) are at Delhi and Chandigarh, which are well connected by road and rail.
 By rail: Umri (Kurukshetra) railway station is a railway junction station, well connected with all important towns and cities of the country. The Shatabadi Express halts here. Dhoda Kheri, Dhirpur, Dhola Majra Shahabad Markanda and Mohri are the railway stations between Kurukshetra to Ambala of Indian railway route.

Higher education
Govt Senior Secondary School,Umri
Govt. Industrial Training Institute, Umri
Govt. Polytechnic, Umri
National Institute of Electronics & Information Technology, Kurukshetra
National Institute of Design, Kurukshetra

References

Villages in Kurukshetra district